is a Japanese-American filmmaker.

Early life
Born in Nagano to schoolteachers and raised in Chiba, Japan, Hirayanagi moved to the Los Angeles area in the early 1990s as a high school exchange student.

She graduated from San Francisco State University with a BA in theater arts. She went on to attend NYU Tisch School of the Arts and graduated with a MFA in film production.

Career 
While in graduate school, her second year project, Mo Ikkai, won the Grand Prix at the 2012 Short Shorts Film Festival in Asia.

Her thesis short film, Oh Lucy!, received a Tisch's First Prize Wasserman Award at the 2014 First Run Festival, and also won more than 25 awards around the globe, including prizes at Cannes Film Festival (2014), Sundance Film Festival (2015), and the Toronto International Film Festival (2014).

Her feature-length version of Oh Lucy! was a recipient of the 2016 Sundance/NHK Award. She was recently named one of the ″20 Rising Women Directors You Need to Know″ by IndieWire., and was nominated at the 2018 Film Independent Spirit Awards for Best First Feature. The project was funded by Cathay Organisation CEO Meileen Cho.

Hirayanagi was invited to join the Academy of Motion Picture Arts and Sciences in 2018.

Personal life
Hirayanagi is a black belt in Kyokushin Karate, and came in 3rd place in the Los Angeles Cup Women's Category.

Atsuko currently resides in Noe Valley, San Francisco, CA.

References

Filmmakers from California
American artists of Japanese descent
Year of birth missing (living people)
Living people
People from Nagano (city)
People from Chiba (city)
Japanese women film directors
Japanese emigrants to the United States
Tisch School of the Arts alumni